The Short-Tempered Clavier and other dysfunctional works for keyboard was released in 1995 by Telarc Records. The album contains works by Peter Schickele, sometimes under his pseudonym of P. D. Q. Bach, including "works for various types of keyboards, including theatre organ, calliope, the ever popular piano, and the organ of the King Congregational Church of Fayray, North Dakota." The title is a parody of Johann Sebastian Bach's Well-Tempered Clavier.

Performers
 Professor Peter Schickele, steam calliope, organ
 Christopher O'Riley, famous concert pianist
 Dennis James, famous theater organist
 David Robinson, whoever  is

Track listing
 Opening & Introduction (4:50)The Short-Tempered Clavier, Preludes and Fugues in all the Major and Minor Keys Except for the Really Hard Ones, S. easy as 3.14159265
 I. C major (2:46)
 II. C minor (1:48)
 III. C-sharp minor (3:35)
 IV. D major (1:32)
 V. D minor (2:28)
 VI. E-flat major (2:19)
 VII. F major (4:01)
 VIII. G minor (2:02)
 IX. G major (2:33)
 X. A major (3:37)
 XI. A minor (1:39)
 XII. B-flat major (3:13)
 Introduction (3:16)Little Pickle Book for theater organ and dill piccolos, S. 6
 I. Toccata et Fuga Obnoxia (3:52)
 II. Chorale Prelude (Ave Maria et Agnus Dei) (1:49)
 III. Fantasia sopra "Fräulein Maria Mack" (1:36)
 IV. Lullaby and Goodnight (2:35)
 Introduction (1:16)Sonata Da Circo (Circus Sonata) for steam calliope, S. 3 ring
 I. Spiel Vorspiel (2:34)
 II. Entrada Grande (3:07)
 III. Smokski the Russian Bear (1:23)
 IV. Toccata Ecdysiastica (1:05)
 Calliope Frustration (0:42)
 Introduction (1:07)Three Chorale-Based Piecelets for Organ, S. III
 I. Chorale: "Orally" (2:05)
 II. Chorale Prelude on an American Hymn for the Last Sunday Before the Fourth Day of the Seventh Month After New Year's Eve (1:24)
 III. Chorale Variations on "In der Nacht so Hell, der Petrus ist mein Freund" (5:23)
 Epilogue (1:24)

Technical information

 The Short-Tempered Clavier was recorded in Mechanics Hall (Worcester, Massachusetts), February 22, 1995.
 Little Pickle Book was recorded on the Mighty Wurlitzer Theater Organ in the Imperial Spud Theater, Hoople, North Dakota, April 11, 1995, with additional recording at Commercial Recording Studio, Studio 1, Cleveland, Ohio, May 1, 1995.
 Sonata Da Circo was recorded on a Morecraft Steam Calliope at the Circus Hall of Fame, Peru, Indiana, May 30, 1995.
 Three Chorale-Based Piecelets was recorded next to the feedlots at King Congregational Church, Fayray, North Dakota, May 1, 1995.

Sources
 P. D. Q. Bach: The Short-Tempered Clavier

P. D. Q. Bach albums
Compositions covering all major and/or minor keys
1995 albums
1990s comedy albums
Telarc Records albums